Tobias Alistair Patrick Kebbell (born 9 July 1982) is an English film, television and stage actor. He is known for his roles in films such as Dead Man's Shoes (2004), Control (2007), RocknRolla (2008), Prince of Persia: The Sands of Time (2010), War Horse (2011), Wrath of the Titans (2012), Dawn of the Planet of the Apes (2014), Fantastic Four (2015), Warcraft (2016), A Monster Calls (2016), Ben-Hur (2016), and Gold (2016). He is also known for his work in the Black Mirror episode "The Entire History of You" (2011) and starred in the second film of the MonsterVerse film series, Kong: Skull Island (2017) and the Apple TV+ series Servant (2019–present).

Early life
Kebbell, the fourth of five children, was born in Pontefract, Yorkshire, but grew up in Nottinghamshire where he attended The Grove School (now the Newark Academy) in Balderton. He was brought up by his mother, Michelle (née Mathers), a cook and landscape gardener and his father, Robert Kebbell, an engineer from Zimbabwe. He was raised Catholic, and went to a Catholic primary school.
Kebbell trained in acting at the Central Junior Television Workshop in Nottingham along with Andrew Shim and Vicky McClure.

Career
Kebbell's first movie appearance was as Anthony, a young man with a learning difficulty, in the Shane Meadows directed Dead Man's Shoes. He was nominated for Most Promising Newcomer at the British Independent Film Awards 2004 The same year, Kebbell appeared in Oliver Stone's Alexander and Woody Allen's Match Point.

In 2007, Kebbell played Rob Gretton, the manager of Joy Division in Anton Corbijn's award-winning biopic of Ian Curtis, Control, for which his performance won the Best Supporting Actor Award at the British Independent Film Awards 2007. He was also nominated for the London Film Critics Circle Awards 2007 Best Supporting British Actor Award.

In December 2007, Kebbell took the lead in an episode of season 2 of Jimmy McGovern's BBC series The Street, which subsequently won the BAFTA for Best Drama series. His other work for the BBC included a modern retelling of Macbeth alongside James McAvoy, while his theatre roles included spells at the Almeida Theatre in David Hare's reworking of Maxim Gorky's Enemies  and at the Playhouse in R.C. Sherriff's classic, Journey's End.

In September 2008, Kebbell was featured in RocknRolla (winner of the Empire Award for Best British Film), written and directed by Guy Ritchie, alongside actors Tom Wilkinson, Gerard Butler and Thandiwe Newton. Kebbell played a heroin-addicted musician, Johnny Quid, for which he was nominated for BAFTA Orange Rising Star Award of the 2009 BAFTA Awards, an award voted for by the public. Kebbell was also nominated for the Empire Award for Best Newcomer, but lost out to his friend Gemma Arterton. Kebbell appeared in the 2009 film Cheri, directed by Stephen Frears, in which he took a small role alongside Michelle Pfeiffer. He filmed in Morocco and London with Jake Gyllenhaal for Prince of Persia: Sands of Time.

In 2011, Kebbell played a leading role in "The Entire History of You", the finale of the first series of Charlie Brooker's anthology series Black Mirror, which was written by Jesse Armstrong. Robert Downey Jr. has since bought the rights to adapt the script for a forthcoming film.

In 2014, Kebbell took over the role of Koba in the sequel Dawn of the Planet of the Apes.

Kebbell played the Marvel antagonist, Doctor Doom, in the 2015 Fantastic Four film, and an orc, Durotan, in the 2016 Warcraft. He played Jack Chapman in the fantasy action film Kong: Skull Island (2017), while also providing guidance for Kong's motion capture sequences.

Personal life
Toby has been married to Arielle Wyatt since 2020 and they have one child together.

Filmography

Film

Television

Video games

Music videos

Awards and nominations

References

External links

 

1982 births
British male film actors
British expatriates in the United States
Living people
20th-century British male actors
21st-century British male actors
Male actors from Yorkshire
Male actors from Nottinghamshire
Actors from Pontefract
British male television actors
British male voice actors
Male motion capture actors